Big Dance may refer to:

 NCAA Division I men's basketball tournament, a basketball tournament in the United States
 Big Dance UK, a nine-day biennial festival of dance in the United Kingdom
 AFL Grand Final, an Australian rules football championship game, colloquially referred to as “the big dance”
 Big Dance (horse race) in Sydney, Australia